

Total statistics

Statistics by country

Statistics by competition

UEFA Champions League / European Cup

UEFA Europa League / UEFA Cup

References

European cup history
Bulgarian football clubs in international competitions